The Lone Star Jam is an annual country music festival held in Austin, Texas. The event is produced by 415 Productions, an Austin-based company that coordinates and promotes many events in central Texas. Proceeds from the event go to The Young Texans Against Cancer. Ziegenbock is the presenting sponsor each year.

History
The 2020 edition was held online due to the COVID-19 pandemic.

2019
The 2019 Jam was held on Saturday, May 25 and Sunday, May 26. Performing artists included: The Turnpike Troubadours, Josh Abbott Band, Granger Smith, Casey Donahew, Wade Bowen, Stoney LaRue, William Clark Green, Jon Wolfe, Jason Boland & The Stragglers, Cody Canada & The Departed, Mike Ryan and many more.

2018
The 2018 Jam was held on Saturday, May 26 and Sunday, May 27. Performing artists included: Gary Allan, Randy Rogers Band, Casey Donahew, Kevin Fowler, Reckless Kelly, Roger Creager, Stoney LaRue, William Clark Green, Flatland Cavalry, Roger Creager, Parker McCollum and many more.

2017
The 2017 Jam was held on Saturday, May 27 and Sunday, May 28. Performing artists included:
Saturday May 27:  

Sunday May 28:

2016
The 2016 Jam was held on Saturday, May 7 and Sunday, May 8. Performing artists included:
Saturday May 7:  

Sunday May 8:

2015
The 2015 Jam was held on Saturday, May 2 and Sunday, May 3 at The LBJ Library Lawn on campus at The University Of Texas At Austin. Performing artists included:
Saturday May 2:  

Sunday May 3:

2014
The 2014 Jam was held on Saturday, May 3 and Sunday, May 4 at The LBJ Library Lawn on campus at The University Of Texas At Austin. Performing artists included:
Saturday May 4:  

Sunday May 5:

2013
The 2013 Jam was held on Saturday, May 4 and Sunday, May 5 at The LBJ Library Lawn on campus at The University Of Texas At Austin. Performing artists included:
Saturday May 4:  

Sunday May 5:
Kevin Fowler
Jack Ingram
Cory Morrow
Bob Schneider
Kyle Park
Dirty River Boys
Cody Johnson Band
The Cadillac Three
The Rankin Twins
Randy Rogers Band

2012
The 2012 Lone Star Jam was held May 5, 2012 at The LBJ Library Lawn on campus at The University of Texas at Austin. Performing artists included:

2011
The 2011 Lone Star Jam was held at Waterloo Park on Saturday April 16, 2011. Performing artists included:

2010
The 2010 Lone Star State Jam was held at Waterloo Park on Saturday, April 24, 2010. Artists that performed included:

2009
The 2009 Lone Star State Jam was held on Saturday, April 25, 2009 at Waterloo Park in downtown Austin. Artists that performed at the event include:

2008
The first Lone Star State Jam was held on Saturday, April 26, 2008 at Waterloo Park. Attendance at the event was over 6,000. Artists that performed in 2008 included:

References

External links
 Official website

Festivals in Austin, Texas
Music festivals in Texas
Recurring events established in 2006